The Rural Municipality of Mountain is a rural municipality in the Parkland Region of Manitoba, western Canada.

The municipality, which was named for the nearby Porcupine and Duck Mountains, sits along the east side of both the Porcupine Provincial Forest in the north and the Duck Mountain Provincial Forest in the south.

Its largest communities are the local urban districts of Pine River, Birch River, and Mafeking.

Communities
The constituent communities of the Rural Municipality of Mountain include the following.

Mountain (South):

Cowan
Pine River
 Pulp River

Mountain (North):
 Bellsite
 Birch River
 Lenswood
 Mafeking
 Novra
 Sclater

Demographics 
North part

South part

Combined

References

External links
 Official website

Mountain